Maryland  is a national park in New South Wales, Australia, 746.2 km north of Sydney. 

The average elevation of the terrain is 842 meters. Maryland National Park was established in January 1999. It occupies an area of 2283ha.

See also
 Protected areas of New South Wales
 High Conservation Value Old Growth forest
 Maryland National Park Plan of Management

Reference 

National parks of New South Wales
Protected areas established in 1999
1999 establishments in Australia